The Mahavira Jain temple is built in Osian of Jodhpur District, Rajasthan. The temple is an important pilgrimage of the Oswal Jain community. This temple is the oldest surviving Jain temple in Western India and was built during the reign of Mahārāja Śrī Vatsarāja of Imperial Pratihāras. The temple is visited by both Jain and Hindu.

History 
The Mahavira Temple is an important tirtha for Jains. According to an inscription found at Sachiya Mata Temple dating back to 956 A.D., it was built during the Gurjara-Pratihara dynasty by King Vatsaraja in 783 AD, making it the oldest surviving Jain temple in Western India. According to Jain legends, Acharya Ratnaprabhasuri in ( BCE) restored the life of son of a prominent brahman following this even the villagers converted to Jainism and this place for origination of Oswal community. Witnessing the power of Ratnaprabhasuri Goddess Chamunda was compelled to become a Jain vegetarian deity and became the protector deity of the temple, protecting devotees who worship image of Mahavira in the temple. Ratnaprabhasuri then named her Sachiya Mata as she truthfully advised Ratnaprabhasuri to stay in Osian during Chaturmas. The idol of Mahavira was discovered from buried at temple site.

An inscription dating 953 CE found in the temple states that Osian was rich with decorated temples of every caste. The temple had its first renovation in 956 AD. George Michell describes the existing main temple as "mostly 11th century", with parts from the 8th century. The torana (ornate gateway) is from 1015 CE. The temple was plundered by Muslim rulers, and none of the original idols survived. In 1016 CE, the temple was restored, and a manastambha was constructed. The temple was later renovated in the 12th century.

Architecture 

The Jain temple is dedicated to Mahavira and belongs to Śvētāmbara sect of Jainism. The temple is considered a testimony of architecture Gurjara-Pratihara dynasty. This a large temple surrounded by enclosing wall consisting of garbhagriha, mandapa. The temple features a sanctum, a closed hall, an open porch and an ornate Torana (gateway) and exquisite sculptures. The temple has one closed and two pillared halls elongated the axis of principal shrine. The torana in front of the sanctum is rich with ornate carvings of tirthankaras, 12 in padmasan posture and 4 kayotsarga positions. The pillars of the temple feature intricate artwork are particular Maha-Maru tradition. The temple has seven subsidiaries, four on the eastern and three of the western side of the sanctum. These shrines are joined by pradaksinapatha. Eastern parts of the shrine have figures of Mahavira and Parshavanatha. The Shikhara of the garbhagriha and subsidiary shrine are crowned with amalaka and kalasa. The shikhara above mulprasad was constructed later with Māru-Gurjara architecture.

The outer and inner walls of the sanctum and closed hall are profusely decorated with carvings of Asta-Dikpalas, yaksha-yakshi, tirthankara, vidyadevi, and other deities. Vidyadevi sculptures are portrayed as playing musical instruments. The northern, southern, western walls of the temple have carvings of Neminatha's life like birth, war, renunciation, etc. The antarala ceiling of every shrine in the temple complex is rich with carvings of flowers. Dev-Kulika temple is also part of the temple complex.

There are three  Jivantasvami images inside temple. Two of these idols are identical, with one having inscription dated 1044 C.E. that identifies the idol to be of Rishabhanatha.

A Dādābadī housing footprints of Jain monks is also present near the Mahavir temple.

Mahavira temple is one of the most renowned temples in India. The elaborate architecture is comparable to that Parshvanatha temple, Khajuraho and Ranakpur Jain temple.

Gallery

Conservation 
The temple has undergone repairs, renovations, and modifications. The temple is protected by Archaeological Survey of India.

See also

 Jainism in Rajasthan
 Naugaza Digambar Jain temple

References

Citation

Bibliography

Books

Web

Further reading
Vasavada, Rabindra J., Temple of Mahavira Osiaji, 2001, L. D. Institute of Indology, fully online

Jain architecture
Jain art
Jain temples in Rajasthan
8th-century Jain temples